Payments Network Malaysia Sdn Bhd (PayNet) is the national payments network and shared central infrastructure for Malaysia’s financial markets. It was formed from the merger between the Malaysian Electronic Payment System (MEPS) and Malaysian Electronic Clearing Corporation Sdn Bhd (MyClear) on 1 August 2017. With the merger, PayNet is now the holding company for the PayNet Group which comprises two main subsidiaries, namely Malaysian Electronic Payment System Sdn Bhd (MEPS) and MEPS Currency Management Sdn Bhd (MCM). The PayNet Group is Malaysia's premier payments network and central infrastructure for financial markets.

Bank Negara Malaysia (BNM) owns a majority share in PayNet, along with eleven other local financial institutions as joint shareholders.

History 
PayNet was formed on 1 August 2017 from the merger of MEPs and My Clear.

Services 
The company's current service portfolio includes the following:
eSPICK – The national cheque clearing system of Malaysia.
JomPAY – A payment scheme for paying utility bills 
FPX – A direct-to-bank payment gateway.
DuitNow – Instant account-to-account payment across participating bank and E-wallets.
DuitNow QR – QR code payment scheme, a contactless payment method.

See also 
 National Payments Corporation of India
 MAS Electronic Payment System 
 PayNet

References

External links 
paynet.my
jompay.com.my
duitnow.my

Payment service providers
Payment networks
Payment systems organizations
Banking in Malaysia